The Miller House is a brick house built in Greek Revival style about 1845 in Cooksville, Wisconsin. It was listed on the National Register of Historic Places in 1980 and on the State Register of Historic Places in 1989.

The Miller house was probably built by Chambers and Lovejoy, since the floor plan matches that of the Lovejoy-Duncan, Collins and Dow houses.  Its walls are of vermilion brick. The cornice is wood. Greek Revival elements include the relatively low-pitched roof, cornice returns, the simple straight lintels above the windows, and the sidelights flanking the door. An elliptical fanlight lights the attic.

James Pratt Miller bought the house from Lovejoy in 1865. Unrelated Charles Miller, a farmer from Pennsylvania, bought the house in 1867 and his family lived there until 1947.

References

Houses on the National Register of Historic Places in Wisconsin
National Register of Historic Places in Rock County, Wisconsin
Houses in Rock County, Wisconsin
Greek Revival architecture in Wisconsin
Brick buildings and structures
Houses completed in 1845